Riverview Apartments may refer to:

Riverview Apartments (Wichita, Kansas), listed on the NRHP in Kansas
Riverview Apartments (Toledo, Ohio), listed on the NRHP in Ohio